Robert Morgan (born 1974) is a British filmmaker, director and writer. He is most  known for The Cat with Hands (2001), The Separation (2003) and Bobby Yeah (2011) which between them have won over 30 international awards.

Personal life
Raised in Yateley, Hampshire. Has an older sister 'Eleanor'.

Career
Robert Morgan's passion for film began when he was aged three and watched 1958′s Fiend Without a Face film. He previously studied fine art, so was always drawing and painting. He then studied 'Animation Filmmaking' at The Surrey Institute Of Art And Design (now part of University for the Creative Arts).
He then started his career in film animation with a student short The Man in the Lower Left-Hand Corner of the Photograph in 1997. 'FilmThreat' ran an article describing The Cat With Hands as "mandatory viewing for anyone who wants to write a horror movie".
This film lead to him being commissioned to make 2 short films for Channel 4 and one from S4C in Wales.

He was earlier influenced by Francis Bacon, Edgar Allan Poe, Jan Svankmajer, the Quay Brothers, David Lynch, David Cronenberg, Joel Peter Witkin and Hans Bellmer.

He was a former Channel Four/MOMI animator in residence.

In 2003, he filmed Separation. A 10-minute animated short, begins with a pair of conjoined twin brothers in a hospital room.

Monsters was produced through the Film Council and FilmFour's Cinema Extreme scheme. The film was based on his fears when his family moved close to Broadmoor Hospital in Berkshire. It also uses the idea of violent relationship between siblings, which was also autobiographical. It was premiered at the Edinburgh Film Festival in 2004.

In 2009 he filmed Over Taken for the 48 Hour Film Project (as part of the Branchage film festival), -  filming the whole film in two days (i.e.4 8 hours). He went to Jersey in the Channel Islands, and then he had to pick out of a hat a film genre (he picked 'Western') and a title, and was given a couple of actresses. Then he created a short film out of those elements.

Bobby Yeah is his longest short at 23 minutes, with more characters and development than its predecessors. He likes working with live action or animation/claymation film making processes. He tried to alternate between the two forms.

In 2013, he produced Invocation for Channel 4's 'Random Acts' series.

He occasionally paints,another outlet for his creativity as the film-making processes can take a long time.

Filmography

Awards
 BAFTA Awards 2012 - Nominated BAFTA Film Award Best Short Animation - Bobby Yeah(2011)
 BAFTA Awards, Wales 2004 - Won BAFTA Cymru Award Best Short Film (Y Ffilm Fer Orau) - The Separation(2003)
 Fantasporto 2002 - Won Onda Curta Award - The Cat with Hands(2001)
 Leeds International Film Festival 2005 - Won Grand Prize of European Fantasy Short Film in Silver - Monsters(2004)
 London Sci-Fi Film Festival 2003 - Won Audience Award - The Cat with Hands(2001)
 Mediawave, Hungary 1999 Won Youth Award Best Youth Animation -  The Man in the Lower-Left Hand Corner of the Photograph(1997)
 Rotterdam International Film Festival 2012 Nominated Tiger Award for Short Film Bobby Yeah(2011)
 Tallinn Black Nights Film Festival 2003, Won Animated Dreams Grand Prize "Wooden Wolf" with The Separation(2003)

References

External links

British animated film directors
Stop motion animators
Living people
English filmmakers
1974 births
English animators